Andreas Bischoff-Ehinger (20 November 1812, Basel – 29 July 1875, Basel) was a Swiss entomologist

Bischoff-Ehinger  specialized in Coleoptera. He was an insect dealer. The Bischoff-Ehinger collection is in the Natural History Museum of Basel

References
DEIZalf portrait

Swiss entomologists
1812 births
1875 deaths